Víctor Trinchín (14 August 1911 – 2001) was a Uruguayan sailor. He competed in the Dragon event at the 1960 Summer Olympics.

References

External links
 

1911 births
2001 deaths
Uruguayan male sailors (sport)
Olympic sailors of Uruguay
Sailors at the 1960 Summer Olympics – Dragon
Sportspeople from Montevideo